USS APL-2 is the lead ship of the APL-2-class barracks ship of the United States Navy.

Construction and career
The ship was laid down on 12 May 1944, by the Puget Sound Navy Yard and launched on 6 July 1944. She was commissioned on 25 May 1945.

From 15 to 27 June 1945, she was towed by USS Sotoymo (ATA-121) from Seattle to Pearl Harbor. Between 4 and 22 July of that same year, she was towed by the same ship to Eniewetok.

She was put into the reserve fleet by January 1947.

The ship undertook the CincPacFlt Berthing and Messing Program, in which she is berthed in San Diego since at least the early 2000s. She is being used as a berthing and messing barge.

Awards

American Campaign Medal
Asiatic-Pacific Campaign Medal 
World War II Victory Medal 
Philippines Liberation Medal

References

 

 

Barracks ships of the United States Navy
Ships built in Bremerton, Washington
1944 ships